Bertazzon is an amusement ride manufacturing company based in Sernaglia della Battaglia, Italy. The company produces a variety of flat rides including bumper cars, carousels, swing rides, Matterhorns, Musik Expresses and dark ride systems.

History
In 1951, three brothers began renovating existing amusement rides: Luigi, Ferruccio and Marcello Bertazzon. Bertazzon 3B was founded in 1963 when the company began manufacturing their own rides. The company later spawned a division based in the United States, Bertazzon America. As of 2009, the company is run by the founders' descendants Michele, Alex and Patrizia Bertazzon. As of 2012, Bertazzon employs approximately 60 people, and manages a  manufacturing facility in Italy.

Products
 Bumper Cars – both full size and children's versions
 Carousels
 Swing Carousels
 Matterhorns
 Musik Expresses
 Dark Ride Systems

Installations

Awards
In 2006, Bertazzon was awarded a Golden Pony Award at the Technofolies trade show. Luigi Bertazzon accepted the award on behalf of the company.

See also
 :Category:Amusement rides manufactured by Bertazzon Rides

References

External links

 Bertazzon 3B s.r.l.
 Bertazzon America LLC

Amusement ride manufacturers
Manufacturing companies established in 1963
Manufacturing companies of Italy
Italian companies established in 1963